Adventure Time was a local children's television show on WTAE-TV 4 in Pittsburgh, Pennsylvania, from 1958 to 1979. It was hosted by Paul Shannon, with guitarist Joe Negri and puppeteer Jim Martin. Martin later became a puppeteer for Sesame Street.

Series background
Old Three Stooges shorts were shown, as well as the cartoons Kimba the White Lion, "Dodo- The Kid From Outer Space", KoKo The Clown, Beanie and Cecil, Space Angel, Dick Tracy, Krazy Kat, Snuffy Smith, Popeye, Beetle Bailey (the aforementioned four shows produced by King Features Syndicate, whose parent company is also WTAE's current owner) and Rocky and Bullwinkle. Often the Three Stooges episodes were introduced by Shannon spinning "The Stooge-O-Scope"...a mounted wheel with pictures of the six comic actors who played the Three Stooges attached to it. After Paul would spin the wheel, the camera would zoom into it, with the fade back out going into that day's episode of the Stooges. Moe Howard credited Shannon and the show with playing a major role in the Stooges' national revival in the 1960s.

The show also featured Paul Shannon's alter ego, Nosmo King, a mysteriously silent, bearded man in dark sunglasses, who stalked about the studio in a slouch hat and tan raincoat. Nosmo was also featured "driving his car" around Pittsburgh, or playing a one-man-band type instrument to the likes of The Beatles' "I Saw Her Standing There". The studio audience was composed of children's groups such as Boy and Cub Scout packs, Brownie, Girl Scout, and Camp Fire Girl troops.  Paul regularly featured a "Picture Gallery" on his show.  He would pretend to "play" a player piano and scroll photos of his young listeners that had been sent in to the station.  Other times, songs such as The Toys' "A Lover's Concerto" would play during the showing of the viewer's photos. Occasionally, viewer contests were held, most notably, one in 1966 to meet the Three Stooges at the local Kennywood Park, and one in 1969 to name a new roller coaster at said park. One viewer chose, "The Thunderbolt".  The attraction still remains active at the park today.
  
A high point of the show came each Christmas season, when Paul Shannon loaded children's letters to Santa Claus into a rocket, and launched it to the North Pole. Santa later opened the letters and read them on the air.
Martin's main character in the series was Baby Jeffy. The puppet was lost at one point in production, and Negri claims Martin reacted "like Jeffy was kidnapped."

In his book, Moe Howard of the Three Stooges credited Paul Shannon with sparking renewed interest in the Stooges. Shannon appeared in one of the Stooges' full-length features, The Outlaws Is Coming, as Wild Bill Hickok.

Shannon's alter-ego Nosmo King reportedly got his name from a "No Smoking" sign.   Other popular characters in the series included Happy Howard (The Friendly Spider), Randy Rocket and The Great Mysto the Magician.

Joe Negri took over the show after Shannon retired in 1975. Negri, the music director for ABC affiliate WTAE from 1960 to 1982, hosted other Pittsburgh-based children's shows for the station.  He portrayed Mr. Music on "Rickie and Copper", and hosted "Popeye with Joe and Sandy" as well as "High School Talent Scene" at the same time he was playing Handyman Negri on Mister Rogers' Neighborhood.

See also
List of local children's television series

References

Further reading
 Krug, Karl (October 8, 1958). "On the Town". Pittsburgh Sun-Telegraph. p. 24
 Republic staff (March 31, 1960). "Paul Shannon Hears About Annual Co. Maple Festival". The Meyersdale Republic. p. 9
 Zeitlin, Arnold (May 17, 1960). "Television and Radio News: 'Great Popeye War' Looms on City TV". Pittsburgh Post-Gazette. p. 43
 Post-Gazette staff (January 3, 1961). "Near-Sighted Debut". Pittsburgh Post-Gazette. p. 25
 Gormley, Ken (July 10, 1988). "Growing Up with Paul Shannon". Pittsburgh Sun-Telegraph. pp. F1, F3

External links
 WTAE-TV history page
Pittsburgh Tribune-Review interview with Jim Martin

Mass media in Pittsburgh
1958 American television series debuts
1979 American television series endings
1950s American children's television series
1960s American children's television series
1970s American children's television series
Television shows set in Pittsburgh
Local children's television programming in the United States
American television shows featuring puppetry